Kathy Ahern (May 7, 1949 – July 6, 1996) was an American professional golfer on the LPGA Tour.

Career

Born in Pittsburgh, Pennsylvania, Ahern was raised in Dallas, Texas, and won the Texas women's public links title at age 15  She joined the LPGA Tour direct from high school in 1967 and won three events, including one major title, the LPGA Championship 

Ahern's first win came at the Southgate Ladies Open in August  and the last at George Washington Classic in  She was also a runner-up at the U.S. Women's Open in 1972, the week before her final win. Ahern played little in the 1980s, but remained a presence around the tour and sometimes caddied for Sherri Turner.

Death
After a five-year battle against breast cancer, Ahern died at age 47 at her mother's home in Fountain Hills, Arizona, northeast  At the time of her death, she was a resident of Greenville, South Carolina.

Professional wins

LPGA Tour wins (3)

Major championships

Wins (1)

References

External links

Texas Golf Association – Kathy Ahern

American female golfers
LPGA Tour golfers
Winners of LPGA major golf championships
Golfers from Pittsburgh
Golfers from Phoenix, Arizona
Deaths from cancer in Arizona
Deaths from breast cancer
1949 births
1996 deaths
20th-century American women
20th-century American people